Galey-Buzat (Ğäli-Buźat) is a rural locality (a village) in Buzatovsky Selsoviet, Sterlibashevsky District, Bashkortostan, Russia. The population was 8 as of 2010. There is 1 street.

Geography 
Galey-Buzat is located 55 km southwest of Sterlibashevo (the district's administrative centre) by road. Starolyubino is the nearest rural locality.

References 

Rural localities in Sterlibashevsky District